The 2019 Missouri Tigers football team represented the University of Missouri in the 2019 NCAA Division I FBS football season. The Tigers played their home games at Faurot Field as members of the Eastern Division of the Southeastern Conference. The Tigers were led by fourth-year head coach Barry Odom in his final season with the team.

On January 31, 2019, the Tigers received a postseason ban from the NCAA for the 2019 season due to academic misconduct and providing extra benefits. The school also was placed on three years' probation and had scholarships reduced. Missouri immediately appealed the decision, but the appeal was denied.

On November 30, 2019, a day after the Tigers' win against Arkansas, fourth-year head coach Barry Odom was fired. He finished at Missouri with a record of 25–25, going 13–19 in SEC play.

Previous season
The Mizzou Tigers finished the 2018 season 8–5, 4–4 in SEC play to finish in a tie for third place in the Eastern Division. They were invited to the Liberty Bowl where they lost to Oklahoma State.

Offseason

Recruiting

Incoming

NCAA investigation
On January 31, 2019, the NCAA gave the Tigers a postseason ban for the 2019 season. The Tigers' baseball and softball teams were also declared ineligible for postseason play. The NCAA found that a former University of Missouri tutor violated NCAA bylaws by completing coursework for 12 student athletes in football, baseball, and softball. The tutor or any of the athletes involved in the investigation were not named in the NCAA's report. The tutor received a 10-year show-cause for her involvement in the penalties. The NCAA issued the following penalties:
three years of probation.
a 10-year show-cause order for the former tutor. During that period, any NCAA member school employing the tutor must restrict her from any athletically related duties.
a 2018–19 postseason ban for the baseball and softball programs.
a 2019–20 postseason ban for the football program.
a vacation of records in which football, baseball and, softball student-athletes competed while ineligible. The university must provide a written report containing the matches impacted to the NCAA media coordination and statistics staff within 45 days of the public decision release.
a five percent reduction in the amount of scholarships in each of the football, baseball, and softball programs during the 2019–20 academic year.
Recruiting restrictions for each of the football, baseball, and softball programs during the 2019–20 academic year, including: a seven-week ban on unofficial visits, a 12.5 percent reduction in official visits, a seven-week ban on recruiting communications, a seven-week ban on all off-campus recruiting contacts and evaluations, a 12.5 percent reduction in recruiting-person or evaluation days.
a disassociation of the tutor. 
a fine of $5,000 plus one percent of each of the football, baseball, and softball budgets.

The penalties were upheld after an appeal by Missouri.

Preseason

SEC media poll
The 2019 SEC Media Days were held July 15–18 in Birmingham, Alabama. In the preseason media poll, Missouri was projected to finish in third in the East Division.

Preseason All-SEC teams
The Tigers had five players selected to the preseason all-SEC teams.

Offense

1st team

Albert Okwuegbunam – TE

2nd team

Tre'Vour Wallace-Simms – OL

3rd team

Larry Rountree III – RB

Defense

2nd team

Cale Garrett – LB

3rd team

DeMarkus Acy – DB

Spring game
The 2019 Tigers football spring game took place in Columbia, Missouri on April 13, 2019, at 3 p.m. CST with the Mizzou Black beating the Mizzou Gold 21–3. The leading rusher for the game was Larry Rountree III with 53 rushing yards and 1 touchdown. Kelly Bryant was the leading passer, completing 12 of 17 passes for 150 yards.

Schedule

Schedule Source:

Roster

Game summaries

at Wyoming

 Passing leaders: Sean Chambers (WYO): 6–16, 92 YDS; Kelly Bryant (MIZ): 31–48, 423 YDS, 2 TD, 1 INT
 Rushing leaders: Sean Chambers (WYO): 12 CAR, 120 YDS, 1 TD; Tyler Badie (MIZ): 16 CAR, 53 YDS, 1 TD
 Receiving leaders: Raghib Ismail Jr. (WYO): 2 REC, 42 YDS; Albert Okwuegbunam (MIZ): 3 REC, 72 YDS

West Virginia

Southeast Missouri State

South Carolina

Troy

Ole Miss

at Vanderbilt

at Kentucky

at Georgia

Florida

Tennessee

Sources:

at Arkansas

Rankings

Players drafted into the NFL

References

Missouri
Missouri Tigers football seasons
Missouri Tigers football